Lochalsh, Ontario may refer to:

Lochalsh, Algoma District, Ontario
Lochalsh, Huron County, Ontario